Rommel's Revenge is game programmed by Martin Horsley for the ZX Spectrum and published by Crystal Computing in 1983.  Ports for the Dragon 32 and TRS-80 Color Computer were released in 1984 It is a clone of the arcade coin-op game Battlezone.

References

1983 video games
Amstrad CPC games
Cultural depictions of Erwin Rommel
ZX Spectrum games
Shoot 'em ups
Tank simulation video games
TRS-80 Color Computer games
Video game clones
Video games developed in the United Kingdom